SVZ can refer to:

Subventricular zone, a structure in the mammalian brain
South Volcanic Zone, a volcanic arc in southwestern South America
Slovak Air Force of WWII
 Schweriner Volkszeitung, a German newspaper
Steve van Zandt, an American musician